A selenonic acid is an organoselenium compound containing the SeO3H functional group. Selenonic acids are the selenium analogs of sulfonic acids.  Examples of the acid are rare.  Benzeneselenonic acid is a white solid.  It can be prepared by the oxidation of benzeneselenol.

See also
 Selenenic acid
 Seleninic acid

References 

Functional groups